Xiaoming Wang is the name of:

Xiaoming Wang (paleontologist) (born 1957), Chinese-born vertebrate paleontologist based in the U.S.
Xiaoming Wang-Dréchou (born 1963), Chinese-born French table tennis player